In chemistry, a transition metal boryl complex is a molecular species with a formally anionic boron center coordinated to a transition metal. They have the formula LnM-BR2 or LnM-(BR2LB) (L = ligand, R = H, organic substituent, LB = Lewis base).  One example is (C5Me5)Mn(CO)2(BH2PMe3) (Me = methyl). Such compounds, especially those derived from catecholborane and the related pinacolborane, are intermediates in transition metal-catalyzed borylation reactions.

Synthesis
Oxidative addition is the main route to metal boryl complexes.  Both B-H and B-B bonds add to low-valent metal complexes. For example, catecholborane oxidatively adds to Pt(0) to give the boryl hydride.
C6H4O2BH  +  Pt(PR3)2 →  C6H4O2B Pt(PR3)2H

Addition of diboron tetrafluoride to Vaska's complex gives the triboryl iridium(III) derivative:
2B2F4  +  IrCl(CO)(PPh3)2 →   Ir(BF2)3(CO)(PPh3)2  +  ClBF2

References

Boron
Coordination chemistry